Wa'el, also spelt Wael or Wail, is an ancient Aramaic male given name. The first currently known usage of the name was found and translated at a site called Sumatar Harabesi. There is coinage and inscriptions mentioning a King of Edessa, the "Parthian Wael" and "Wael the king" (Syriac: W'L MLK') on coins around 163AD after the Parthians captured the region from the Romans. The names' usage is pre-Islamic. The name's meaning origin is unknown, however, there are a few different definitions depending on how an ancient text was translated. These known meanings are "clan", "seeking shelter", and "protector". Pronunciation differs based on the varieties of Arabic.

Notable people with the name include:

 Wael Abbas, Egyptian blogger
 Wael Abdelgawad, American author and martial artist
 Wael Al-Dahdouh, Palestinian journalist 
 Wael Badr, Egyptian basketball player
 Wael Ghonim, Egyptian computer engineer, author and activist
 Wael Gomaa, Egyptian footballer
 Wael Jassar, Lebanese singer
 Wael Kfoury, Lebanese singer
 Wael Nazha, Lebanese footballer
 Wael Riad, Egyptian footballer
 Wael Sawan (born 1974), Lebanese-Canadian business executive
 Wael Zwaiter, Palestinian translator
 Wael bar Sahru king of Edessa, Mesopotamia 163–165 AD
Wail al-Shehri, Saudi al-Qaeda terrorist of American Airlines Flight 11

References

Arabic masculine given names